Van Weezer is the fifteenth studio album by American rock band Weezer, released on May 7, 2021 by Crush Music and Atlantic Records. Featuring a classic rock and hard rock inspired sound, the album was announced in September 2019 with an original release date of May 2020, coinciding with announcement of the band's participation in the Hella Mega Tour alongside Green Day and Fall Out Boy. However, due to the COVID-19 pandemic, the tour was delayed indefinitely and Van Weezers release was delayed until May 2021, almost four months after the release of the band's previous album OK Human.

Four singles were released ahead of the album's release; "The End of the Game", "Hero", "Beginning of the End" and "I Need Some of That". A fifth single, "All The Good Ones," was released on the same day as the album. The album received generally positive reviews from critics. It debuted and peaked at number 11 on the US Billboard 200 chart.

Background
In February 2019, Weezer frontman Rivers Cuomo began working on new songs with a hard rock influence, in contrast to the pop rock and electropop sound that had been featured on the band's previous albums Pacific Daydream, the Teal Album, and the then-upcoming Black Album. In an interview that month with Entertainment Weekly, Cuomo mentioned that an album tentatively titled Van Weezer was in the works, and that it would take the band "back to big guitars". He remarked that when the band would perform "Beverly Hills" live in concert, he would perform a guitar solo that was not present on the recorded version of the song. "We noticed that, recently, the crowd just goes crazy when I do that. So it feels like maybe the audience is ready for some shredding again."

The album has been compared to their fourth studio album Maladroit (2002), and is inspired by 1970s and 1980s hard rock and heavy metal bands such as Kiss, Black Sabbath, Metallica and Van Halen (the last of whom inspired the album's title). Cuomo would also state that the album is "Blue Album-ish, but a little more riffy."

Release
On September 10, 2019, the first single from Van Weezer, "The End of the Game" was released along with an announcement that the album would be released on May 15, 2020. The announcement coincided with the revelation of the Hella Mega Tour, a 2020 concert tour featuring Weezer, Green Day, and Fall Out Boy. On May 6, 2020, the second single "Hero" was released onto streaming services; while Weezer announced that the album release would be delayed due to the COVID-19 pandemic, stating that despite this fans would receive "surprises" within the next week. A short snippet of "Blue Dream" debuted on The Simpsons episode "The Hateful Eight-Year-Olds", on which Weezer guest-starred as themselves. On August 14, 2020, the band announced that the album had been delayed to May 2021 in order to coincide with the rescheduled Hella Mega Tour. That same day, the third single, "Beginning of the End", was released as a part of the soundtrack for Bill & Ted Face the Music.

On October 6, 2020, after Eddie Van Halen died, the album was dedicated to him. In addition to Van Halen, the album is also dedicated to Ric Ocasek, who produced the band's debut, The Blue Album, The Green Album, & Everything Will Be Alright in the End, as Ocasek passed away in September 2019. 

The track listing was announced on April 20, 2021, and the fourth single, "I Need Some of That" was released the following day.

The album was officially released on May 7, 2021 along with an animated music video for "All The Good Ones".

The album was released just three and a half months after its predecessor, OK Human, which was originally intended to be released after Van Weezer.

Critical reception

Van Weezer received generally favorable reviews from music critics. At Metacritic, which assigns a normalized rating out of 100 to reviews from mainstream publications, the album received an average score of 67 based on 20 reviews, indicating "generally favorable reviews". Stephen Thomas Erlewine at AllMusic gave the album a positive review, stating "...any of its retro origins are washed away by big, dumb sounds that keep the record grounded in the eternal now, an aesthetic choice that also helps the album be a rousing good time." Erlewin praised the homage to Van Halen on the album. Mark Beaumont from NME was a bit more mixed on the album, whom considered the choruses as some of the band's best, but opined that the second half of the album as lesser quality from the first half. Beaumont went on to observe "there's a stone-cold classic Weezer album hidden beneath the fretboard flam."

Track listing

Sample credits
"I Need Some of That" contains interpolations of "Heat of the Moment", as written by Geoff Downes and John Wetton and as performed by Asia, and "(Don't Fear) The Reaper", as written by Donald Roeser and performed by Blue Öyster Cult.
"Beginning of the End" contains an interpolation of "The Longest Time", as written and performed by Billy Joel.
"Blue Dream" contains an interpolation of "Crazy Train", as written by Ozzy Osbourne, Randy Rhoads, and Bob Daisley and performed by Ozzy Osbourne.
"Sheila Can Do It" contains an interpolation of "Girls, Girls, Girls", as performed by Mötley Crüe.
Notes
1.On Apple Music, tracks 1 & 3 are switched.

Personnel
Credits adapted from TIDAL.

Weezer
 Rivers Cuomo – lead vocals, guitars, keyboards, backing vocals
 Patrick Wilson – drums
 Brian Bell – guitars, backing vocals
 Scott Shriner – bass, backing vocals

Additional personnel

 Joe LaPorta – mastering
 Matty Green – mixer
 Suzy Shinn – producer , engineer , recording engineer , additional guitar , additional vocals , synthesizer 
 Charlie Brand – engineer , additional vocals 
 Ivan Wayman – engineer , assistant engineer 
 Shawn Everett – engineer 
 Wesley Sideman – engineer 
 Coast Modern – additional programming, additional vocals 
 Andreas Kvinge Sandnes – assistant engineer 
 Jake Sinclair – assistant engineer 
 Sejo Navajas – assistant engineer 
 John Sinclair – assistant engineer 
 Johnny Morgan – assistant engineer 
 Josh Skinner – assistant engineer 
 Lizzy Ostro – assistant engineer 
 Michael Beinhorn – pre-production 
 Ross Garfield – drum technician 
 Mike Fasano – drum technician

Charts

References

2021 albums
Weezer albums
Atlantic Records albums
Crush Management albums
Albums postponed due to the COVID-19 pandemic
Albums in memory of deceased persons
Albums produced by Suzy Shinn
Glam metal albums
Hard rock albums by American artists